A rest is a musical notation sign that indicates the absence of a sound.

Each rest symbol and name corresponds with a particular note value for length, indicating how long the silence should last.

Description 
Rests are intervals of silence in pieces of music, marked by symbols indicating the length of the pause. Each rest symbol and name corresponds with a particular note value, indicating how long the silence should last, generally as a multiplier of a measure or whole note.

 The quarter (crotchet) rest  (𝄽) may also be found as a form  in older music.
 The four-measure rest or longa rest are only used in long silent passages which are not divided into bars.
 The combination of rests used to mark a pause follows the same rules as for note values.

One-bar rests 

When an entire bar is devoid of notes, a whole (semibreve) rest is used, regardless of the actual time signature. Some published (usually earlier) music places the numeral "" above the rest to confirm the extent of the rest.

Occasionally in manuscript autographs and facsimiles, bars without notes are sometimes left completely empty, possibly even without the staves.

Multiple measure rests 

In instrumental parts, rests of more than one bar in the same meter and key may be indicated with a multimeasure rest (British English: multiple bar rest), showing the number of bars of rest, as shown. Multimeasure rests of are usually drawn in one of two ways:
 As long, thick horizontal lines placed on the middle line of the staff, with serifs at both ends (see above middle picture) or as thick diagonal lines placed between the second and fourth lines of the staff (but this method is much less used than the above method; although a small number of publishers use this method, it most commonly used casually in modern manuscripts), regardless of how many bars' rests it represents;
 The former system of notating multirests (deriving from Baroque notation conventions that were adapted from the old mensural rest system dating from Medieval times) draws multirests according to the picture above right until a certain amount of bar rests is reached when multirests are then drawn to the first method. How long exactly must a multirest be until the above method is used is largely a matter of personal taste, most publishers use ten as the changing point, however bigger and smaller changing points are used, especially in earlier music.

The number of whole-rest lengths for which the multimeasure rest lasts is indicated by a number printed above the musical staff (usually at the same size as the numerals in a time signature). If a meter or key change occurs during a multimeasure rest, the rest must be broken up as required for clarity, with the change of key and/or meter indicated between the rests. This also applies in the case of double barlines, which demarcate musical phrases or sections, and also if a rehearsal letter occurs during the rest..

Dotted rests 

In these meters the long-standing convention has been to indicate one beat of rest as a quarter rest followed by an eighth rest (equivalent to three eighths). See: Anacrusis.

General pause 
In a score for an ensemble piece, "G.P." (general pause) indicates silence for one bar or more for the entire ensemble. The marking of general pauses is relevant, as making noise should be avoided there—for instance, page turns in sheet music are avoided during general pauses, as the sound of players turning the page would be audible by the audience.

See also 
 Caesura
 List of silent musical compositions
 List of musical symbols
 Tacet

References 

Musical notation
Rhythm and meter
Silence

de:Notenwert#Pausen